Masao Tsuchida (born 9 September 1953) is a retired male badminton player from Japan.

Career
He competed at the 1980 IBF World Championships in men's singles and lost to Liem Swie King in final.

References

Japanese male badminton players
Living people
Badminton players at the 1974 Asian Games
Badminton players at the 1978 Asian Games
1953 births
Asian Games competitors for Japan
20th-century Japanese people